Austria competed at the 1992 Winter Paralympics in Tignes/Albertville, France. 31 competitors from Austria won 20 medals including 8 gold, 3 silver and 9 bronze and finished 4th in the medal table.

See also 
 Austria at the Paralympics
 Austria at the 1992 Winter Olympics

References 

Austria at the Paralympics
1992 in Austrian sport
Nations at the 1992 Winter Paralympics